Świątniki is a village in the administrative district of Gmina Lubraniec, within Włocławek County, Kuyavian-Pomeranian Voivodeship, in north-central Poland.

It is the birthplace of Polish sociologist Florian Znaniecki (1882–1958).

References

Villages in Włocławek County